The men's 110 metres hurdles event at the 1959 Summer Universiade was held at the Stadio Comunale di Torino in Turin on 5 and 6 September 1959.

Medalists

Results

Heats
Held on 5 September

Semifinals
Held on 6 September

Final
Held on 6 September

References

Athletics at the 1959 Summer Universiade
1959